Stonebrook is a historic home located at Antonia, Jefferson County, Missouri.  It was built in 1958–1959, and is a two-section, split-level frame house in the Modern Movement style.  It sits on a concrete foundation and is sheathed in vertical wooden siding with battens and horizontal weatherboard.  The Stonebrook property is a documented pre-glacial Missouri wildflower preserve.

It was listed on the National Register of Historic Places in 2011.

References 

Houses on the National Register of Historic Places in Missouri
Modernist architecture in Missouri
Houses completed in 1959
Buildings and structures in Jefferson County, Missouri
National Register of Historic Places in Jefferson County, Missouri